The Leibniz Institute for Solar Physics (aka: KIS), formerly known as Kiepenheuer Institute for Solar Physics (KIS) is a  research institute located in Freiburg, Germany. As a member of the Leibniz Association, the institute conducts basic research in astronomy and astrophysics with a particular focus on solar physics. The institute's structure and operation is based on three strategic pillars: 1) fundamental research, 2) operation of the German solar telescope infrastructure  on Tenerife, and 3) applied research in data science and operation of the Science Data Center. Institute's Professors appointed and habilitated at the University of Freiburg offer lectures at various university degree levels and train young scientists.

History
The institute was founded in 1943 as the 'Fraunhofer Institute' by Karl-Otto Kiepenheuer. Kiepenheuer was director of the institute from 1943 until his death in 1975. The institute was renamed as the 'Kiepenheuer Institute for Solar Physics' to honour the founder of the institute and to enable the Fraunhofer Society to call their own institutes (the first of which was founded in 1954), 'Fraunhofer Institutes'. Both institutions had been named independently after the physicist Joseph von Fraunhofer, and they had no other connection besides the name. In November 2018, name of the institute was renamed to Leibniz Institute for Solar Physics (KIS – Leibniz-Institut für Sonnenphysik (KIS) – to highlight the institute's membership in the Leibniz Association.

Organisation
The Leibniz Institute for Solar Physics (KIS) is a foundation under public law of the state of Baden-Württemberg and a member of the Leibniz Association. The organs of the Leibniz Institute for Solar Physics (KIS) are the Foundation Council, the Scientific Advisory Council and the Board of Directors. The institute is divided into two scientific departments: "Solar and Stellar Astrophysics" and "Observatory and Instrumentation." A third administrative-technical department combines the cross-sectional groups of administration and technical service.

Observatories
The Leibniz Institute for Solar Physics operates solar observing facilities for its own research and for the solar community in Germany and other countries. The institute's prime facilities are the German solar telescopes at the Teide Observatory of the Intituto des Astrofisica de Canarias on Tenerife, Spain, with Europe's largest solar telescope GREGOR as well as the Vacuum Tower Telescope. In addition, the institute is involved in a number of modern ground-based and space- and balloon-borne observing facilities such as  Daniel K. Inouye Solar Telescope (DKIST),  balloon-borne Solar Observatory, and Solar Orbiter. These include both instrumentation developments and scientific activities.

From the 1940s to 1980s, the institute operated the Schauinsland Observatory (near Freiburg) as a research facility. It is now exclusively used for teaching and public outreach purposes.

From the 1950s to 1988, the institute operated the Solar Observatory in Anacapri, Capri, Italy. The Coudé refractor became operational in 1966, and from that time the solar telescope on the Schauinsland continued to be used only for testing equipment. For several years, the Capri observatory with its domeless telescope provided observation time to the institute.

In the early 1970s, the institute searched for a suitable place to establish a European solar observatory, and Karl-Otto Kiepenheuer took an active part in this search. Finally the Spanish island of Tenerife was chosen, due its dry weather and stable atmosphere. In 1989, the Vacuum Tower Telescope became operational, with a 70-cm mirror and adaptive optics. The outpost in Capri was closed after the solar observatory at the Teide Observatory became operational. In 2013, GREGOR Solar Telescope, equipped with a 1.5 m primary mirror, started its science operations at the Teide Observatory.

References

External links
 Leibniz Institute for Solar Physics (KIS)

Research institutes in Germany
Astrophysics institutes
1943 establishments in Germany
Freiburg im Breisgau